Pembroke College Boat Club is the rowing club for members of Pembroke College, Cambridge. Over the last century, crews from Pembroke have held the headship of the men's Lent Bumps on four occasions, and the headship of the men's May Bumps ten times. The men's 1st VIII spent their entire history in the 1st division of both events, apart from poor performances in the Lent Bumps 2000 and the May Bumps 2003, and the crew is usually found in the top half of the division. The women's 1st VIII first raced in 1985, and have not yet taken the headship of the Lent Bumps, but took the headship of the May Bumps in 1997, 1998, 2006, 2008, 2009 and 2010.

Honours

Henley Royal Regatta

See also
University rowing (UK)

References

 Durack, John; Gilbert, George; Marks, Dr. John (2000). The Bumps: An Account of the Cambridge University Bumping Races 1827-1999 
 CUCBC (various years) - Lent and May Bumps programmes.

External links
Pembroke College Boat Club

Rowing clubs of the University of Cambridge
Boat
1827 establishments in England
Sports clubs established in 1827
Rowing clubs in Cambridgeshire
Rowing clubs in England
Rowing clubs of the River Cam